The Kibbutz crisis was an acute economic crisis many of the kibbutzim in Israel experienced during the 1980s and that many still experience today. The crisis began in the early 1980s and intensified after the Israeli economic stabilization program of 1985 during which the inflation stopped, and was characterized by the accumulating of large debts from the kibbutzim and in low return. The economic crisis in many of the kibbutzim was also accompanied by a social crisis and a demographic crisis. In 1989 and 1996 the Israeli government, the Israeli banks and the kibbutz movements agreed upon two debt arrangements to help resolve the economic crisis. The demographic crisis and the social crises were the major catalyst for the change processes many of the kibbutzim have experienced since the 1990s.

Alongside the many kibbutzim who ended up experiencing an economic crisis, is a small group of kibbutzim the crisis skipped. These kibbutzim remained mostly loyal to the traditional values and way of life of the kibbutz and many of them have assisted tremendously in repaying the debt of the economically weak kibbutzim.

The historical background of the crisis 
The kibbutz crisis during the 1980s was not the first financial crisis of the kibbutzim. It was preceded by many crises, which were followed by many debt settlements as well. The first debt settlement took place in 1924 and since then, debt settlements have been carried out about once every decade and a half.

In the 1950s, following a deep crisis in the kibbutz movement, a new department was established in the Ministry of Agriculture whose main purpose was to make a recovery program in the kibbutzim. This department developed in 1958 a concentrated credit plan, according to which each kibbutz was assigned to one of three banks. The three banks were Bank Hapoalim, Bank Leumi and the Agriculture Bank. As part of this settlement many of the debts of each kibbutz were deleted, while the other part of the debt was re-distributed, and these banks were responsible for giving the kibbutzim the credit for their development.

During all those years, a recognition formed among the Israeli governments, the banks and the kibbutz movement, that the Israeli governments are supposed to guarantee the kibbutzim's debt, and that they would keep on making the payments for the kibbutzim's debt in one way or another. This realization crystallized during the period when the Israeli government completely controlled the capital market, and allocated credit to selected favored destinations - according to its own priorities.

The role of banks in the system was technical: they were used as a mean for the government to transfer credit, without actually carrying out financial risk management as needed in a free market system.

In addition to receiving credit from the banks, the kibbutzim also received additional credit from kibbutz movement funds and from regional and national shopping organizations. As part of this credit guarantees were made according to which each kibbutz had a guarantee to the debts of the kibbutz movement funds, and through this mechanism to all the kibbutzim's debt. These credit guarantees gave the financial systems in the kibbutzim and in the banks the false feeling that they would be capable of overcoming any financial crisis in the future.

The economical background of the crisis 
During the discussion that evolved following the kibbutz crises, different explanations for the crises were raised. The banks, naturally, and a large part of the Israeli society saw the conduct of the kibbutzim as main reason for the crisis, while the kibbutzim tended, naturally, to impose a large part of the responsibility to the crisis on banks and the Israeli government.

The main arguments raised against the kibbutzim addressed the following points:
 Investments made without economic justification: due to the ease of credit gain, the kibbutzim invested large sums of money in industry and agriculture, often when the investment did not have an economic justification, and often without sufficient examination of the investment in terms of financial risk management.
 Inefficient allocation of personnel and capital: it was argued that investments in industry and agriculture were made because of the desire to reduce the use of wage workers (for ideological reasons), or due to lack of willingness of different kibbutz members to work in certain positions or in certain shifts.
 Borrowing money at fixed interest rates: During the high inflation period, which reached more than 400 percent a year, the financial instrument used for raising capital was fixed-rate loans, which often carried very high nominal interest rates. When the inflation stopped, the interest of these loans became devastating. The kibbutz, as any other financial businesses, were not capable of making profits in this rate (which as mentioned reached more than 400%), and this led to the increase of the debt due to the loans.
 Making speculative investments in the stock market: unlike the kibbutz ideology, which put an emphasis on productive work and condemned making speculative profits, the kibbutzim participated, especially through the kibbutz movement funds, in the trading of stocks in the stock market, and incurred heavy losses during the bank shares collapse in 1983.

Recent studies made by anthropologists in the kibbutzim indicate how social factors led to these errors. The main social factor was the lack of leadership that resulted from the rotation norm that the leaders of the kibbutz movements encouraged to ensure their control in kibbutzim: conservative kibbutzim managers incapable of thinking critically and loyal to the kibbutz movement were promoted at the end of a short term, while managers who were critical thinkers and innovators were often not promoted or as a result left their kibbutz.

Claims directed towards the banks included:
 Reliance on the government to cover the kibbutzim debt: despite knowing that the credit given to the kibbutzim were nor enough securities, the banks continued to provide credit, based on the assumption that when it would be needed, the government would make sure that the debt would be covered.
 Depriving debt calculation: the banks calculated the debt estimation not according to the law, which increased to huge proportions from the mid-1980s. This was done by making calculations that deprived the debt owners. According to the kibbutzim, the use of these methods with a high real interest percentage caused a significant increase of the debt.

It was argued that the inflation halting plan the government implemented in July 1985 was too drastic, leading to a real interest of hundreds of percent, this situation especially affected the agricultural sector, which has a credit need due to the agriculture "production process" that lasts many months. In addition, many of the investments in agriculture yield profit only years later, for example plantations, cultivating cattle and sheep, as well as export-oriented industry encouraged by the government also required substantial credit.

The development of the crisis during the 1980s 

In May 1977, the Likud party came to power, the first time in thirty years of Labor rule. The new prime minister Menachem Begin appointed Simha Erlich as the finance minister. Erlich introduced an economic reform, aimed to change the character of the Israeli economy and transforming its socialist ideology characteristics to a more capitalist characteristics. Following the economic measures taken, which were not accompanied by reduced government budgets, the inflation jumped from 34 percent in 1977 to 131 percent in 1980.

Despite a later exchange of Ministers in the Ministry of Finance and despite economic programs were held designed to stop the inflation, the vital step of reducing government budgets was not carried out, and as a result the inflation continued to rise until it came to its peak in 1984 at about 374 percent. These years were years of glory for contemporary financial experts, who managed to balance raging inflation and the gradually strengthening dollar against the pound and the Shekel, and produced profits from the volatility and the uncertainty in the capital markets. Although the Kibbutzim, which were identified with the Israeli Labor Party, lost their political gain and their ability to dramatically influence the decision-making political centers, when the Likud party came to power, many of them continued to act the same as they did during the rule of the Israeli Labor party, being confident that the government would provide them with a safety net if necessary, as it did in the past.

The debt settlements with the kibbutzim  
The first debt settlements with the kibbutzim were preceded by attempts to establish plans to solve the different financial problems. At first it was plans were initiated by the kibbutz movement, and later on they were conducted in conjunction with the Israeli banks. All these plans failed eventually. At the end of 1989, after a year of discussions, the kibbutz movements, Israeli banks and the Ministry of Finance a settlement was achieved. The main principles of the settlement were:
 The banks would delete the kibbutz debts of 2 billion NIS (at 1993 values).
 An additional debt of 1.3 billion NIS  would be deleted with government funding.
 Raising of 1.7 billion NIS for repayment for the whole kibbutz debt to the banking system.
 Long-term redeployment of 6.7 billion NIS of the debt, with an interest rate of 4.5% per year.
 Cancellation of mutual Co-signing between the kibbutzim.
 A reimbursement assessment was determined for each kibbutz based on each Kibbutz means of production.
 Establishment of a governing body to monitor implementation of the settlement—defined as a trustee of all the three parties in the settlement.

In practice, not all of the debt deletions, which were originally included in the settlement, were actually carried out. The debt interest also turned out to be much higher than stipulated in the settlement, and as a result, many of the kibbutzim failed to pay the debts and their debt only kept on growing. At the beginning of the 1990s new discussions began on an additional settlement. Ultimately it was decided that "the complementary settlement" will begin in 1994, but the agreement itself was signed only by 1996 . The main principles of the complementary settlement were:
 The Kibbutzim were divided into two groups “Real estate Kibbutzim” and “Peripheral Kibbutzim”.
 The debts of all the different kibbutzim was redefined so that it would be fully paid for within 20 years. The remaining debt for the rest of the kibbutzim was defined as a "bubble".
 The “bubble” debt of the “Peripheral Kibbutzim” was deleted. It was determined  that the “bubble” debt of the “Real estate Kibbutzim” would be deleted after the real estate of these kibbutzim would be transferred to the Israel Land Administration and they would receive a compensation for the grounds.
 The Kibbutzim would transfer 25 percent of their holdings in Tnuva to the state.

Since the signing of the complementary settlement and until the end of 2003, the majority of the kibbutzim joined the settlement (out of the 135 kibbutzim that were supposed to take part). The settlement caused much criticism within the Israeli society. Many claimed that the settlement proved the state had a priority for a particular sector in the Israeli society, while the state was discriminatory towards many Israeli businesses that collapsed during those years as a result of the government's actions. However, the settlement did not only serve the interest of the kibbutzim, but also of the other parties involved in the settlement – the banks managed to improve their financial situation after receiving the government deposits. Furthermore, due to the settlement they were able to significantly increase the repayment of kibbutz debt compared to the repayment of kibbutz debt before the signing of the complementary settlement. Similar settlements were made with a variety of other institutions in Israel, such as factories, Business group and other local authorities.

The status of kibbutzim today 
In the discussions prior to the debt arrangements with the kibbutzim, a considerable amount of the kibbutz movement leaders opposed the arrangements, claiming they would end the kibbutzim, because the repayment capacity defined was set too high and therefore would not enable new growth to the kibbutzim. To some extent, it can be said that they were right because in practice, despite the vast improvement in performances of the Kibbutz business in recent years, many of the kibbutzim that signed on the debt arrangement could not repay the extent of the debt agreed upon. In addition, during the 1990s many kibbutz members, especially those that previously had leading roles in the kibbutzim, decided to leave the kibbutz. They did this mainly because, in their view, under the debt arrangements, the kibbutz was a body without a possibility of growth, under which the members’ standard of living would be frozen during all the years of the arrangements (up until 2013). The debt arrangements accelerated the brain drain of the kibbutzim, which made them non-creative and sped their transformations to economic entities that would adapt organizational solutions of a capitalist society that conflicted with their own principles, which eventually led to the dismantling of the majority of the kibbutzim.

Some argue that the debt arrangements, which were accompanied by monitoring and supervising of the conduct of the kibbutzim by the banks, eventually led to better economic conduct in most of the kibbutzim, which allowed them to improve their business performance in recent years. Nevertheless, alongside the improved business performance, most of the collective and collaborative culture in the kibbutz disappeared and only a few kibbutzim remained collaborative yet also adapted capitalist arrangements through the years. Since the change was done due to an economic and demographic distress, and as a result of the brain drain and the despair from the collaborative past that seemingly led to the crisis, attempts to rebuild the kibbutzim as collaborative and democratic bodies stopped, and the prosperous capitalist Israeli economy became the role model for the Israeli kibbutzim.

Monetary compensation mechanisms were introduced according to members' occupations, which immediately decreased the standard of living of most Kibbutz members to the standard of living of a non-professional worker or professional worker, and raised the standard of living of the Kibbutz managers, most of which grew up in the kibbutz and received their education at the expense of the Kibbutz. The salary of the kibbutz managers was now as high as the salary of a manager in the private sector, which was 5-10 times higher than the Kibbutz members who financed their studies. These managers were supposed to ensure a fair pension for the veteran kibbutz members, but most of them did not do justice with the veterans who built the kibbutz they managed, and pensions did not reach the minimum agreed on by the kibbutz movement.

In January 2008, the kibbutz movement followed through its part of the debt arrangements and gave 25% of their holdings in Tnuva to the state (financial value of about $100 million). Meanwhile, new debt arrangements were made with several kibbutzim, based on funds those kibbutzim received from the sale that were allocated to payment of the delayed debt to the banking system and the Jewish Agency.

References

External links 
 After 100 years, the kibbutz movement has completely changed Published in 2010.01.07 at haaretz.com
 The Changing Kibbutz - published at kibbutz.org.il
 Death of an Icon - published at israeleconomy.org

Economic history of Israel
Kibbutzim
Financial crises
1980s in Israel